Henrico is an unincorporated community in Northampton County, North Carolina, United States. Henrico has a post office with ZIP code 27842.

References

Unincorporated communities in Northampton County, North Carolina
Unincorporated communities in North Carolina